Solute carrier family 22 member 25 (SLC22A25), also known as organic anion transporter UST6, is a protein that in humans is encoded by the SLC22A25 gene.

References

Further reading

Solute carrier family